KNDK may refer to:

 KNDK (AM), a radio station (1080 AM) licensed to Langdon, North Dakota, United States
 KLME, a radio station (95.7 FM) licensed to Langdon, North Dakota, which held the call sign KNDK-FM from 1991 to 2021